During the 1983–84 English football season, Queens Park Rangers competed in the First Division, having been promoted as the Second Division champions the previous season.

Season summary
QPR enjoyed a solid season upon their return to the First Division, finishing fifth and qualifying for the UEFA Cup. At the end of the season, their manager Terry Venables left to manage Barcelona; he was replaced by the Crystal Palace manager Alan Mullery.

Kit
QPR's kits were manufactured by Adidas, who introduced a new kit for the season. The kits also bore sponsorship for the first time, with Rangers receiving sponsorship from Guinness.

Results
Queens Park Rangers' score comes first

Football League First Division

FA Cup

League Cup

Squad
Squad at end of season

Left club during season

Youth team

Douglas McClure

References

Queens Park Rangers F.C. seasons
Queens Park Rangers